NEXT (Hangul: 넥스트; stylized as N.EX.T as an abbreviation for New EXperiment Team) was a South Korean rock band known for its provocative songs that critiqued social injustice. The band was formed by iconic Korean experimental rock singer Shin Hae-chul and debuted in 1992 with the album Home. NEXT went through several line-up changes over the years and has been inactive since Shin's death in 2014.

History
NEXT (New EXperiment Team) was the band of singer/songwriter Shin Hae Chul (신해철). The group split up following the 1997 release of Lazenca: A Space Rock Opera, and the instrumentalists formed the alternative metal band Novasonic with rapper Kim Jun Pyo. 

N.EX.T reformed around 2003 following the disbanding of Novasonic, and they released the soundtrack to Guilty Gear XX #Reload. A few of its instrumental songs were re-worked into songs with vocals on the following album, The Return Of N.EX.T Part 3: The Book of War/The Diary of a Soldier. The Return of N.EX.T Part 3 included the song "Dear America" which featured many prominent Korean vocalists such as Kim Jun Pyo and Crash's Ahn Heung-Chan. Guitarist Kim Se-hwang released his first solo album, Vivaldi: The Four Seasons, on June 27, 2011.

In 2014, group leader Shin Hae-chul passed away after poor medical treatment for cardiac arrest. On August 8, 2015, the band made their last appearance at the Pentaport Rock Festival, along with other musicians, for a special memorial stage for Shin. Since then, NEXT has been considered to be on hiatus.

Themes
NEXT's songs contain many cultural criticisms, with "Turn Off the T.V." and "Money" pointing to mediation and consumerism. Criticism of human disregard for the environment can be found in "Lazenca, Save Us" and "The World We Made," which creates musical contrasts between a pleasant, natural world and a terrifying, industrial, human-influenced world. "Cyber Budha Company Ltd." tells of a dark future in which humans can purchase small amounts of divinity through the use of machines and credit cards.

Members 
NEXT went through multiple line-up changes between 1992 and 2014.
 Shin Hae-chul (1992–2014) – vocals
 Jeong Gi-song (1992) – guitar
 Lee Dong-gyu (1992–1994) – drums, bass guitar
 Im Chang-su (1994) – guitar
 Lee Su-yong (1994–1997, 2006) – drums
 Kim Se-hwang (1995–1997, 2005–2014) – guitar
 Kim Yeong-seok (1995–1997, 2006) – bass guitar
 Won San-guk (2003–2005) – bass guitar
 Devin Lee (2003–2006) – guitar
 Dr. Juny (2003–2005) – drums
 Dong Hyeok (2003–2005) – keyboard
 Ji Hyeon-su (2006–2014) – keyboard
 Yun Te-ra (2007–2008) – drums
 Jade (2007–2014) – bass guitar
 Kim Dan (2008–2014) – drums

Discography

Studio albums

Compilation and live albums

Soundtrack albums

Singles

See also 
 Shin Hae-chul

References

Alternative metal musical groups
South Korean progressive rock groups
South Korean hard rock musical groups
South Korean heavy metal musical groups
Musical groups established in 1992
Musical quintets
Musical groups from Seoul
Progressive metal musical groups